George W. Bush served as the 46th governor of Texas from 1995 until 2000, when he resigned as governor amid his transition into the U.S. presidency after having been elected president in the 2000 United States presidential election. As governor, Bush successfully sponsored legislation for tort reform, increased education funding, set higher standards for schools, and reformed the criminal justice system. Bush also pioneered faith-based welfare programs and helped make Texas the leading producer of wind powered electricity in the US.

1994

With his father George H. W. Bush's election to the United States presidency in 1988, speculation had arisen among Republicans that George W. Bush would enter the 1990 Texas gubernatorial election. This was offset by Bush's purchase of the Texas Rangers baseball team and personal concerns regarding his own record and profile after which Bush declared his candidacy for the 1994 election, even as his brother Jeb first sought the governorship of Florida. Winning the Republican primary easily, Bush faced incumbent Governor Ann Richards, a popular Democrat who was considered the easy favorite, given Bush's lack of political credentials.

Bush was aided in his campaign by a close coterie of political advisers that included Karen Hughes, a former journalist who was his communications adviser; Joe Allbaugh, who became his campaign manager, and Karl Rove, a personal friend and political activist who is believed to have been a strong influence in encouraging Bush to enter the election. Bush's aides crafted a campaign strategy that attacked Governor Richards' record on law enforcement, her political appointments, and her support of liberal political causes. Bush developed a positive image and message with themes of "personal responsibility" and "moral leadership." His campaign focused on issues such as education (seeking more accountability for schools over student performance), crime, deregulation of the economy, and tort reform.  Following an impressive performance in the debates, Bush's popularity grew. He won with 54.1 percent against Richards' 45.9 percent.

1998

As a popular governor, Bush won re-election in a landslide victory with nearly 69 percent of the vote.

He won 49 percent of the Latino vote and 27 percent of the African American vote, becoming the first Texas governor to be elected for two consecutive terms since Dolph Briscoe was re-elected in 1974. Within a year, he had decided to seek the Republican nomination for the Presidency.

Policies

Capital punishment
Under his leadership, Texas executed 154 prisoners (including Karla Faye Tucker and Betty Lou Beets), more than any previous governor in modern American history; critics such as Helen Prejean argue that he failed to give serious consideration to clemency requests.

During his tenure, Bush presided over more executions of death row inmates than any other Governor in the history of Texas so far, surpassed only by his successor Rick Perry (Governor from 2000-2015). The rate averages an execution in the state every nine days. The only death penalty case among the 155 that came across George W. Bush's desk in his tenure as Texas Governor in which Governor Bush intervened and commuted the death sentence was that of serial killer Henry Lee Lucas.

Fiscal
Seeking to reduce high property taxes to benefit homeowners while increasing general education funding, Bush sought to create business taxes, but faced vigorous opposition from his own party and the private sector. Failing to obtain political consensus for his proposal, Bush used a budget surplus to push through a $2 billion tax-cut plan, which was the largest in Texas history and cemented Bush's credentials as a pro-business fiscal conservative. To pay for the tax cuts, he sought federal approval of a plan to privatize Texas' social services.

Bush also helped make Texas the leading producer of wind powered electricity in the US. In 1996 Bush made wind power a key facet of Texas' renewable energy policy. Under a 1999 Texas state law, electric retailers are obliged to buy a certain amount of energy from renewable sources (RPS), This environmentally progressive legislation is a counterpoint to the energy policies of his presidency that favored the status quo.

Social
Bush also pioneered faith-based welfare programs by extending government funding and support for religious organizations providing social services such as education, alcohol and drug abuse prevention, and reduction of domestic violence. As governor, he reached out to religious leaders such as Kirbyjon Caldwell (who would later offer the official benediction at Bush's presidential inauguration). He signed a memorandum on April 17, 2000 proclaiming June 10 to be Jesus Day in Texas, a day where he "urge[d] all Texans to answer the call to serve those in need." Although Bush was criticized for allegedly violating the Establishment Clause of the First Amendment ("Congress shall make no law respecting an establishment of religion"), his initiative was popular with most people across the state, especially religious and social conservatives. In the 1996 United States Presidential Election, Bush criticized Republican nominee Bob Dole for trying to bring Pro-choice advocates into the party.

Education

Bush supported local control of schools, higher educational standards, and an updated academic curriculum. Charter schools mired in financial scandals. There were protests against one test determining a child's promotion.

Appointments

Right after his re-election, Bush named insurance commissioner Elton Bomer, a Democrat from Anderson County in East Texas, as the new Texas Secretary of State. He also appointed Michael L. Williams to the Texas Railroad Commission in 1999 upon the resignation of Carole Keeton Strayhorn (who was then known as Carole Keeton Rylander at the time), who resigned following her election as Comptroller of Public Accounts in 1998.

Williams became the first African American to serve in an executive statewide office, and easily won a special election in 2000 for an unexpired term and was re-elected to six-year terms in 2002 and 2008.

Election as president in 2000

During his presidential transition, Bush resigned from the governorship on December 21, 2000.

References

Governor of Texas
Bush, George W.
Bush, George W.
1995 beginnings
2000 endings
1990s in Texas
2000s in Texas
Bush, George W.